Jorge Lara can refer to:
Jorge Cerdán Lara (1897–1958), Mexican politician
Jorge Salvador Lara (1926–2012), Ecuadorian politician
Jorge Lara Castro (born 1945), Paraguayan lawyer, sociologist and diplomat
Jorge Luis Lara Aguilar (born 1954), Mexican politician
Jorge Alberto Lara Rivera (born 1966), Mexican politician
Jorge A. Lara, screenplay author of 2013 Spanish adventure film Zip & Zap and the Marble Gang, nominated for 28th Goya Awards

See also 
Jorge and Lara, participants of 2011 Spanish reality show Gran Hermano (Spain) All Stars 2011